Scopula mentzeri is a moth of the family Geometridae. It is found on Crete.

The larvae feed on Berberis cretica.

References

Moths described in 1993
mentzeri
Moths of Europe